The 2011–12 National League A season was the fifth ice hockey season of the National League A since the reorganization of the Swiss league. 12 teams participated in the league, which was won by EV Zug.

Regular season

Standings

Attendance

League Leaders

Scoring

Playoffs

Tournament Bracket

Quarter-Finals Results

EV Zug (1) vs. EHC Biel (8)

HC Davos (2) vs. ZSC Lions (7)

HC Fribourg-Gottéron (3) vs. HC Lugano (6)

Kloten Flyers (4) vs. SC Bern (5)

Semi-finals results

EV Zug (1) vs. ZSC Lions (7)

Fribourg-Gottéron HC (3) vs. SC Bern (5)

Finals Results

SC Bern (5) vs. ZSC Lions (7)

Playout

The bottom 4 teams of the National League A will compete in a losing team advances tournament to determine if they should stay in the League. The loser of this tournament will compete against the champions of the National League B to determine which league they will play in next season.

Tournament Bracket

Semi-finals results

Genève-Servette HC (9) vs. Rapperswil-Jona Lakers (12)

SCL Tigers (10) vs. HC Ambrì-Piotta (11)

Finals Results

Genève-Servette HC (9) vs. HC Ambrì-Piotta (11)

Playdowns
Ambrì-Piotta would later defeat SC Langenthal, Champions of the National League B, 4–1 to remain in the National League A

External links
 

1
Swiss
National League (ice hockey) seasons